Erik (Erkki) Peltonen (1 May 1861 - 25 January 1942) was a Finnish schoolteacher and politician. He was born in Askola, and was a member of the Diet of Finland from 1905 to 1906 and of the Parliament of Finland from 1908 to 1909, representing the Young Finnish Party.

References

1861 births
1942 deaths
People from Askola
People from Uusimaa Province (Grand Duchy of Finland)
Young Finnish Party politicians
Members of the Diet of Finland
Members of the Parliament of Finland (1908–09)
Finnish schoolteachers